The 2014–15 Evansville Purple Aces men's basketball team represented the University of Evansville during the 2014–15 NCAA Division I men's basketball season. The Purple Aces, led by eighth year head coach Marty Simmons, played their home games at the Ford Center and were members of the Missouri Valley Conference. They finished the season 24–12, 9–9 in MVC play to finish in fifth place. They lost in the quarterfinals of the Missouri Valley tournament to Illinois State. They were invited to the CollegeInsider.com Tournament where they defeated IPFW, Eastern Illinois, Louisiana–Lafayette, UT Martin, and Northern Arizona to become CIT champions.

Previous season
The Purple Aces finished the season 14–19, 6–12 in MVC play to finish in a tie for eighth place. They advanced to the quarterfinals of the Missouri Valley tournament where they lost to Wichita State.

Departures

Incoming transfers

Class of 2015 recruits

Roster

Schedule

|-
!colspan=9 style="background:#5C2F83; color:#FF5100;"| Exhibition

|-
!colspan=9 style="background:#5C2F83; color:#FF5100;"| Regular season

|-
!colspan=12 style="background:#5C2F83; color:#FF5100;"| Missouri Valley Conference regular season

|-
!colspan=9 style="background:#5C2F83; color:#FF5100;"| Missouri Valley tournament

|-
!colspan=9 style="background:#5C2F83; color:#FF5100;"| CIT

References

Evansville Purple Aces men's basketball seasons
Evansville
Evansville
CollegeInsider.com Postseason Tournament championship seasons
Evans
Evans